The Progressive Party of Maldives, also known by its  PPM, is a political party in Maldives with a total membership of 37,093 as of 11 July 2021. The stated goal of the party is driving Maldives towards an independent and democratic, safe and secure, high income, high human capital, developed nation state with a diversified and robust economy whilst preserving its Islamic heritage.

History

2011–2012
The party was formed by Maumoon Abdul Gayoom in 2011 after resigning from his first party, Dhivehi Rayyithunge Party (DRP), citing corruption of views after new leadership. The political party first emerged from a faction of DRP, named Z-DRP, which was formed by Gayyoom in early 2011. This occurred after in-party disputes between Gayyoom, who was serving as the party's retired "Supreme Leader", and the current leader, Ahmed Thasmeen Ali.

On 4 September 2011, Gayyoom handed in his resignation from the DRP announcing that the Z-DRP faction of the party, would become a new "corruption-intolerant" party independent from the DRP. The very next day, he unveiled the plans for the "Progressive Party of Maldives".

On 8 October 2011, the proposed party was granted license from the Elections Commission to go ahead; giving the party a time frame of 9 months to register itself with the government.

In August 2012, PPM accused the Maldivian Democratic Party (MDP, the main opposition party) of pressuring the United Nations Human Rights Committee, and called the 2012 Maldives report of this UN organ "serious and concerning", condemning the UN calls to allow same-sex rights and religious freedom in the Maldives.

2013–2018-Ruling Party
On 17 November 2013, PPM became the ruling party of Maldives after its candidate Abdulla Yameen (Maumoon's half-brother) won the 2013 Maldivian Presidential Election, defeating MDP Candidate Mohamed Nasheed in the runoff.

In 2014, PPM took majority of the People's Majlis after winning 33 seats in the Parliament election of 2014, while coalition partners JP won 15 seats and Maldives Democratic Alliance (MDA) taking 15 seats.

As of 2015, both JP and religiously conservative Adhaalath Party have left the Government coalition.

In 2018, incumbent President Abdulla Yameen lost the elections to opposition candidate Ibrahim Mohamed Solih.

2018 - Present - Opposition

Party Split and coalition with PNC 
Due to a leadership dispute between former President Abdulla Yameen, and Maumoon Abdul Gayoom, and due to fears of loss of leadership, the party leadership split the party into two separate parties, a new party called People's National Congress (PNC), and PPM. The party won the case. PPM and PNC formed an opposition alliance called the Progressive Congress Coalition.

In April 2019, parliamentary election PPM lost heavily. The Maldivian Democratic Party (MDP) of president Ibrahim Mohamed Solih won a landslide victory. It took 65 of 87 seats of the parliament.

Former president and leader of the party Abdulla Yameen was sentenced to five years in prison in November 2019 for money laundering. The High Court upheld the jail sentence in January 2021. However, the case was overturned by the Supreme Court of Maldives on 30 November 2021.

Electoral history

President elections

People's Majlis elections

References

External links
Progressive Party of Maldives official website
Progressive Party Of Maldives

Political parties established in 2011
Islamic political parties in the Maldives
2011 establishments in the Maldives
Social conservative parties
Right-wing parties